The carbon cycle is the biogeochemical cycle by which carbon is exchanged among the biosphere, pedosphere, geosphere, hydrosphere, and atmosphere of Earth. Carbon is the main component of biological compounds as well as a major component of many minerals such as limestone. Along with the nitrogen cycle and the water cycle, the carbon cycle comprises a sequence of events that are key to make Earth capable of sustaining life. It describes the movement of carbon as it is recycled and reused throughout the biosphere, as well as long-term processes of carbon sequestration to and release from carbon sinks. Carbon sinks in the land and the ocean each currently take up about one-quarter of anthropogenic carbon emissions each year.

Humans have disturbed the biological carbon cycle for many centuries by modifying land use, and moreover with the recent industrial-scale mining of fossil carbon (coal, petroleum, and gas extraction, and cement manufacture) from the geosphere. Carbon dioxide in the atmosphere had increased nearly 52% over pre-industrial levels by 2020, forcing greater atmospheric and Earth surface heating by the Sun. The increased carbon dioxide has also increased the acidity of the ocean surface by about 30% due to dissolved carbon dioxide, carbonic acid and other compounds, and is fundamentally altering marine chemistry.  The majority of fossil carbon has been extracted over just the past half century, and rates continue to rise rapidly, contributing to human-caused climate change.  The largest consequences to the carbon cycle, and to the biosphere which critically enables human civilization, are still set to unfold due to the vast yet limited inertia of the Earth system. Restoring balance to this natural system is an international priority, described in both the Paris Climate Agreement and Sustainable Development Goal 13.

Main components

The carbon cycle was first described by Antoine Lavoisier and Joseph Priestley, and popularised by Humphry Davy.  The global carbon cycle is now usually divided into the following major reservoirs of carbon interconnected by pathways of exchange:
 The atmosphere
 The terrestrial biosphere
 The ocean, including dissolved inorganic carbon and living and non-living marine biota
 The sediments, including fossil fuels, freshwater systems, and non-living organic material.
 The Earth's interior (mantle and crust). These carbon stores interact with the other components through geological processes.

The carbon exchanges between reservoirs occur as the result of various chemical, physical, geological, and biological processes. The ocean contains the largest active pool of carbon near the surface of the Earth.
The natural flows of carbon between the atmosphere, ocean, terrestrial ecosystems, and sediments are fairly balanced; so carbon levels would be roughly stable without human influence.

Atmosphere

Carbon in the Earth's atmosphere exists in two main forms: carbon dioxide and methane. Both of these gases absorb and retain heat in the atmosphere and are partially responsible for the greenhouse effect. Methane produces a larger greenhouse effect per volume as compared to carbon dioxide, but it exists in much lower concentrations and is more short-lived than carbon dioxide. Thus, carbon dioxide contributes more to the global greenhouse effect than methane.

Carbon dioxide is removed from the atmosphere primarily through photosynthesis and enters the terrestrial and oceanic biospheres. Carbon dioxide also dissolves directly from the atmosphere into bodies of water (ocean, lakes, etc.), as well as dissolving in precipitation as raindrops fall through the atmosphere. When dissolved in water, carbon dioxide reacts with water molecules and forms carbonic acid, which contributes to ocean acidity. It can then be absorbed by rocks through weathering. It also can acidify other surfaces it touches or be washed into the ocean.

Human activities over the past two centuries have increased the amount of carbon in the atmosphere by nearly 50% as of year 2020, mainly in the form of carbon dioxide, both by modifying ecosystems' ability to extract carbon dioxide from the atmosphere and by emitting it directly, e.g., by burning fossil fuels and manufacturing concrete.

In the far future (2 to 3 billion years), the rate at which carbon dioxide is absorbed into the soil via the carbonate–silicate cycle will likely increase due to expected changes in the sun as it ages.  The expected increased luminosity of the Sun will likely speed up the rate of surface weathering. This will eventually cause most of the carbon dioxide in the atmosphere to be squelched into the Earth's crust as carbonate. Once the concentration of carbon dioxide in the atmosphere falls below approximately 50 parts per million (tolerances vary among species), C3 photosynthesis will no longer be possible. This has been predicted to occur 600 million years from the present, though models vary.

Once the oceans on the Earth evaporate in about 1.1 billion years from now, plate tectonics will very likely stop due to the lack of water to lubricate them. The lack of volcanoes pumping out carbon dioxide will cause the carbon cycle to end between 1 billion and 2 billion years into the future.

Terrestrial biosphere

The terrestrial biosphere includes the organic carbon in all land-living organisms, both alive and dead, as well as carbon stored in soils. About 500 gigatons of carbon are stored above ground in plants and other living organisms, while soil holds approximately 1,500 gigatons of carbon. Most carbon in the terrestrial biosphere is organic carbon,  while about a third of soil carbon is stored in inorganic forms, such as calcium carbonate. Organic carbon is a major component of all organisms living on earth. Autotrophs extract it from the air in the form of carbon dioxide, converting it into organic carbon, while heterotrophs receive carbon by consuming other organisms.

Because carbon uptake in the terrestrial biosphere is dependent on biotic factors, it follows a diurnal and seasonal cycle. In CO2 measurements, this feature is apparent in the Keeling curve. It is strongest in the northern hemisphere because this hemisphere has more land mass than the southern hemisphere and thus more room for ecosystems to absorb and emit carbon.

Carbon leaves the terrestrial biosphere in several ways and on different time scales. The combustion or respiration of organic carbon releases it rapidly into the atmosphere. It can also be exported into the ocean through rivers or remain sequestered in soils in the form of inert carbon. Carbon stored in soil can remain there for up to thousands of years before being washed into rivers by erosion or released into the atmosphere through soil respiration. Between 1989 and 2008 soil respiration increased by about 0.1% per year. In 2008, the global total of CO2 released by soil respiration was roughly 98 billion tonnes, about 3 times more carbon than humans are now putting into the atmosphere each year by burning fossil fuel (this does not represent a net transfer of carbon from soil to atmosphere, as the respiration is largely offset by inputs to soil carbon). There are a few plausible explanations for this trend, but the most likely explanation is that increasing temperatures have increased rates of decomposition of soil organic matter, which has increased the flow of CO2. The length of carbon sequestering in soil is dependent on local climatic conditions and thus changes in the course of climate change.

Ocean

The ocean can be conceptually divided into a surface layer within which water makes frequent (daily to annual) contact with the atmosphere, and a deep layer below the typical mixed layer depth of a few hundred meters or less, within which the time between consecutive contacts may be centuries. The dissolved inorganic carbon (DIC) in the surface layer is exchanged rapidly with the atmosphere, maintaining equilibrium. Partly because its concentration of DIC is about 15% higher but mainly due to its larger volume, the deep ocean contains far more carbon—it is the largest pool of actively cycled carbon in the world, containing 50 times more than the atmosphere—but the timescale to reach equilibrium with the atmosphere is hundreds of years: the exchange of carbon between the two layers, driven by thermohaline circulation, is slow.

Carbon enters the ocean mainly through the dissolution of atmospheric carbon dioxide, a small fraction of which is converted into carbonate. It can also enter the ocean through rivers as dissolved organic carbon. It is converted by organisms into organic carbon through photosynthesis and can either be exchanged throughout the food chain or precipitated into the oceans' deeper, more carbon-rich layers as dead soft tissue or in shells as calcium carbonate. It circulates in this layer for long periods of time before either being deposited as sediment or, eventually, returned to the surface waters through thermohaline circulation. Oceans are basic (~pH 8.2), hence CO2 acidification shifts the pH of the ocean towards neutral.

Oceanic absorption of CO2 is one of the most important forms of carbon sequestering which limit the human-caused rise of carbon dioxide in the atmosphere. However, this process is limited by a number of factors.  CO2 absorption makes water more acidic, which affects ocean biosystems. The projected rate of increasing oceanic acidity could slow the biological precipitation of calcium carbonates, thus decreasing the ocean's capacity to absorb CO2.

Geosphere

The geologic component of the carbon cycle operates slowly in comparison to the other parts of the global carbon cycle. It is one of the most important determinants of the amount of carbon in the atmosphere, and thus of global temperatures.

Most of the earth's carbon is stored inertly in the earth's lithosphere. Much of the carbon stored in the earth's mantle was stored there when the earth formed. Some of it was deposited in the form of organic carbon from the biosphere. Of the carbon stored in the geosphere, about 80% is limestone and its derivatives, which form from the sedimentation of calcium carbonate stored in the shells of marine organisms. The remaining 20% is stored as kerogens formed through the sedimentation and burial of terrestrial organisms under high heat and pressure. Organic carbon stored in the geosphere can remain there for millions of years.

Carbon can leave the geosphere in several ways. Carbon dioxide is released during the metamorphism of carbonate rocks when they are subducted into the earth's mantle. This carbon dioxide can be released into the atmosphere and ocean through volcanoes and hotspots. It can also be removed by humans through the direct extraction of kerogens in the form of fossil fuels. After extraction, fossil fuels are burned to release energy and emit the carbon they store into the atmosphere.

Terrestrial carbon in the water cycle

In the diagram on the right:

 Atmospheric particles act as cloud condensation nuclei, promoting cloud formation.
Raindrops absorb organic and inorganic carbon through particle scavenging and adsorption of organic vapors while falling toward Earth.
Burning and volcanic eruptions produce highly condensed polycyclic aromatic molecules (i.e. black carbon) that is returned to the atmosphere along with greenhouse gases such as CO2. 
Terrestrial plants fix atmospheric CO2 through photosynthesis, returning a fraction back to the atmosphere through respiration. Lignin and celluloses represent as much as 80% of the organic carbon in forests and 60% in pastures. 
Litterfall and root organic carbon mix with sedimentary material to form organic soils where plant-derived and petrogenic organic carbon is both stored and transformed by microbial and fungal activity.
Water absorbs plant and settled aerosol-derived dissolved organic carbon (DOC) and dissolved inorganic carbon (DIC) as it passes over forest canopies (i.e. throughfall) and along plant trunks/stems (i.e. stemflow). Biogeochemical transformations take place as water soaks into soil solution and groundwater reservoirs and overland flow occurs when soils are completely saturated, or rainfall occurs more rapidly than saturation into soils.
Organic carbon derived from the terrestrial biosphere and in situ primary production is decomposed by microbial communities in rivers and streams along with physical decomposition (i.e. photo-oxidation), resulting in a flux of CO2 from rivers to the atmosphere that are the same order of magnitude as the amount of carbon sequestered annually by the terrestrial biosphere. Terrestrially-derived macromolecules such as lignin and black carbon are decomposed into smaller components and monomers, ultimately being converted to CO2, metabolic intermediates, or biomass.
Lakes, reservoirs, and floodplains typically store large amounts of organic carbon and sediments, but also experience net heterotrophy in the water column, resulting in a net flux of CO2 to the atmosphere that is roughly one order of magnitude less than rivers. Methane production is also typically high in the anoxic sediments of floodplains, lakes, and reservoirs.
Primary production is typically enhanced in river plumes due to the export of fluvial nutrients. Nevertheless, estuarine waters are a source of CO2 to the atmosphere, globally.
Coastal marshes both store and export blue carbon. Marshes and wetlands are suggested to have an equivalent flux of CO2 to the atmosphere as rivers, globally.
Continental shelves and the open ocean typically absorb CO2 from the atmosphere. 
The marine biological pump sequesters a small but significant fraction of the absorbed CO2 as organic carbon in marine sediments (see next section).

The marine biological pump

The marine biological pump is the ocean's biologically driven sequestration of carbon from the atmosphere and land runoff to the deep ocean interior and seafloor sediments. The biological pump is not so much the result of a single process, but rather the sum of a number of processes each of which can influence biological pumping. The pump transfers about 11 billion tonnes of carbon every year into the ocean's interior. An ocean without the biological pump would result in atmospheric CO2 levels about 400 ppm higher than the present day.

Most carbon incorporated in organic and inorganic biological matter is formed at the sea surface where it can then start sinking to the ocean floor. The deep ocean gets most of its nutrients from the higher water column when they sink down in the form of marine snow. This is made up of dead or dying animals and microbes, fecal matter, sand and other inorganic material.

The biological pump is responsible for transforming dissolved inorganic carbon (DIC) into organic biomass and pumping it in particulate or dissolved form into the deep ocean. Inorganic nutrients and carbon dioxide are fixed during photosynthesis by phytoplankton, which both release dissolved organic matter (DOM) and are consumed by herbivorous zooplankton. Larger zooplankton - such as copepods, egest fecal pellets - which can be reingested, and sink or collect with other organic detritus into larger, more-rapidly-sinking aggregates. DOM is partially consumed by bacteria and respired; the remaining refractory DOM is advected and mixed into the deep sea. DOM and aggregates exported into the deep water are consumed and respired, thus returning organic carbon into the enormous deep ocean reservoir of DIC.

A single phytoplankton cell has a sinking rate around one metre per day. Given that the average depth of the ocean is about four kilometres, it can take over ten years for these cells to reach the ocean floor. However, through processes such as coagulation and expulsion in predator fecal pellets, these cells form aggregates. These aggregates have sinking rates orders of magnitude greater than individual cells and complete their journey to the deep in a matter of days.

About 1% of the particles leaving the surface ocean reach the seabed and are consumed, respired, or buried in the sediments. The net effect of these processes is to remove carbon in organic form from the surface and return it to DIC at greater depths, maintaining a surface-to-deep ocean gradient of DIC. Thermohaline circulation returns deep-ocean DIC to the atmosphere on millennial timescales. The carbon buried in the sediments can be subducted into the earth's mantle and stored for millions of years as part of the slow carbon cycle (see next section).

Fast and slow cycles

There is a fast and a slow carbon cycle. The fast cycle operates in the biosphere and the slow cycle operates in rocks. The fast or biological cycle can complete within years, moving carbon from atmosphere to biosphere, then back to the atmosphere. The slow or geological cycle can take millions of years to complete, moving carbon through the Earth's crust between rocks, soil, ocean and atmosphere.

The fast carbon cycle involves relatively short-term biogeochemical processes between the environment and living organisms in the biosphere (see diagram at start of article). It includes movements of carbon between the atmosphere and terrestrial and marine ecosystems, as well as soils and seafloor sediments. The fast cycle includes annual cycles involving photosynthesis and decadal cycles involving vegetative growth and decomposition. The reactions of the fast carbon cycle to human activities will determine many of the more immediate impacts of climate change.

The slow carbon cycle involves medium to long-term geochemical processes belonging to the rock cycle (see diagram on the right). The exchange between the ocean and atmosphere can take centuries, and the weathering of rocks can take millions of years. Carbon in the ocean precipitates to the ocean floor where it can form sedimentary rock and be subducted into the earth's mantle. Mountain building processes result in the return of this geologic carbon to the Earth's surface. There the rocks are weathered and carbon is returned to the atmosphere by degassing and to the ocean by rivers. Other geologic carbon returns to the ocean through the hydrothermal emission of calcium ions. In a given year between 10 and 100 million tonnes of carbon moves around this slow cycle. This includes volcanoes returning geologic carbon directly to the atmosphere in the form of carbon dioxide. However, this is less than one percent of the carbon dioxide put into the atmosphere by burning fossil fuels.

Deep carbon cycle 

Although deep carbon cycling is not as well-understood as carbon movement through the atmosphere, terrestrial biosphere, ocean, and geosphere, it is nonetheless an important process. The deep carbon cycle is intimately connected to the movement of carbon in the Earth's surface and atmosphere. If the process did not exist, carbon would remain in the atmosphere, where it would accumulate to extremely high levels over long periods of time. Therefore, by allowing carbon to return to the Earth, the deep carbon cycle plays a critical role in maintaining the terrestrial conditions necessary for life to exist.

Furthermore, the process is also significant simply due to the massive quantities of carbon it transports through the planet. In fact, studying the composition of basaltic magma and measuring carbon dioxide flux out of volcanoes reveals that the amount of carbon in the mantle is actually greater than that on the Earth's surface by a factor of one thousand. Drilling down and physically observing deep-Earth carbon processes is evidently extremely difficult, as the lower mantle and core extend from 660 to 2,891 km and 2,891 to 6,371  km deep into the Earth respectively. Accordingly, not much is conclusively known regarding the role of carbon in the deep Earth. Nonetheless, several pieces of evidence—many of which come from laboratory simulations of deep Earth conditions—have indicated mechanisms for the element's movement down into the lower mantle, as well as the forms that carbon takes at the extreme temperatures and pressures of said layer. Furthermore, techniques like seismology have led to a greater understanding of the potential presence of carbon in the Earth's core.

Carbon in the lower mantle 

Carbon principally enters the mantle in the form of carbonate-rich sediments on tectonic plates of ocean crust, which pull the carbon into the mantle upon undergoing subduction. Not much is known about carbon circulation in the mantle, especially in the deep Earth, but many studies have attempted to augment our understanding of the element's movement and forms within the region. For instance, a 2011 study demonstrated that carbon cycling extends all the way to the lower mantle. The study analyzed rare, super-deep diamonds at a site in Juina, Brazil, determining that the bulk composition of some of the diamonds' inclusions matched the expected result of basalt melting and crystallisation under lower mantle temperatures and pressures. Thus, the investigation's findings indicate that pieces of basaltic oceanic lithosphere act as the principle transport mechanism for carbon to Earth's deep interior. These subducted carbonates can interact with lower mantle silicates, eventually forming super-deep diamonds like the one found.

However, carbonates descending to the lower mantle encounter other fates in addition to forming diamonds. In 2011, carbonates were subjected to an environment similar to that of 1800 km deep into the Earth, well within the lower mantle. Doing so resulted in the formations of magnesite, siderite, and numerous varieties of graphite. Other experiments—as well as petrologic observations—support this claim, indicating that magnesite is actually the most stable carbonate phase in most part of the mantle. This is largely a result of its higher melting temperature. Consequently, scientists have concluded that carbonates undergo reduction as they descend into the mantle before being stabilised at depth by low oxygen fugacity environments. Magnesium, iron, and other metallic compounds act as buffers throughout the process. The presence of reduced, elemental forms of carbon like graphite would indicate that carbon compounds are reduced as they descend into the mantle.

Polymorphism alters carbonate compounds' stability at different depths within the Earth. To illustrate, laboratory simulations and density functional theory calculations suggest that tetrahedrally coordinated carbonates are most stable at depths approaching the core–mantle boundary. A 2015 study indicates that the lower mantle's high pressure causes carbon bonds to transition from sp2 to sp3 hybridised orbitals, resulting in carbon tetrahedrally bonding to oxygen. CO3 trigonal groups cannot form polymerisable networks, while tetrahedral CO4 can, signifying an increase in carbon's coordination number, and therefore drastic changes in carbonate compounds' properties in the lower mantle. As an example, preliminary theoretical studies suggest that high pressure causes carbonate melt viscosity to increase; the melts' lower mobility as a result of its increased viscosity causes large deposits of carbon deep into the mantle.

Accordingly, carbon can remain in the lower mantle for long periods of time, but large concentrations of carbon frequently find their way back to the lithosphere. This process, called carbon outgassing, is the result of carbonated mantle undergoing decompression melting, as well as mantle plumes carrying carbon compounds up towards the crust. Carbon is oxidised upon its ascent towards volcanic hotspots, where it is then released as CO2. This occurs so that the carbon atom matches the oxidation state of the basalts erupting in such areas.

Carbon in the core 
Although the presence of carbon in the Earth's core is well-constrained, recent studies suggest large inventories of carbon could be stored in this region. Shear (S) waves moving through the inner core travel at about fifty percent of the velocity expected for most iron-rich alloys. Because the core's composition is believed to be an alloy of crystalline iron and a small amount of nickel, this seismic anomaly indicates the presence of light elements, including carbon, in the core. In fact, studies using diamond anvil cells to replicate the conditions in the Earth's core indicate that iron carbide (Fe7C3) matches the inner core's wave speed and density. Therefore, the iron carbide model could serve as an evidence that the core holds as much as 67% of the Earth's carbon. Furthermore, another study found that in the pressure and temperature condition of the Earth's inner core, carbon dissolved in iron and formed a stable phase with the same Fe7C3 composition—albeit with a different structure from the one previously mentioned. In summary, although the amount of carbon potentially stored in the Earth's core is not known, recent studies indicate that the presence of iron carbides can explain some of the geophysical observations.

Human influence on carbon cycle

Since the industrial revolution, and especially since the end of WWII, human activity has substantially disturbed the global carbon cycle by redistributing massive amounts of carbon from the geosphere.   Humans have also continued to shift the natural component functions of the terrestrial biosphere with changes to vegetation and other land use.   Man-made (synthetic) carbon compounds have been designed and mass-manufactured that will persist for decades to millennia in air, water, and sediments as pollutants.   Climate change is amplifying and forcing further indirect human changes to the carbon cycle as a consequence various positive and negative feedbacks.

Land use changes

Since the invention of agriculture, humans have directly and gradually influenced the carbon cycle over century-long timescales by modifying the mixture of vegetation in the terrestrial biosphere. Over the past several centuries, direct and indirect human-caused land use and land cover change (LUCC) has led to the loss of biodiversity, which lowers ecosystems' resilience to environmental stresses and decreases their ability to remove carbon from the atmosphere. More directly, it often leads to the release of carbon from terrestrial ecosystems into the atmosphere.

Deforestation for agricultural purposes removes forests, which hold large amounts of carbon, and replaces them, generally with agricultural or urban areas. Both of these replacement land cover types store comparatively small amounts of carbon so that the net result of the transition is that more carbon stays in the atmosphere.  However, the effects on the atmosphere and overall carbon cycle can be intentionally and/or naturally reversed with reforestation.

Herbivore impacts
Increased herbivore populations can alter the amount of carbon dioxide produced from a ecosystem, overall impacting the carbon cycle. Large mobile herbivores have the ability to alter both the above and below ground composition of a ecosystem, through selective feeding, trampling, and waste, all of which decrease plant production. Selectively feeding on high quality plants decreases the aboveground plant composition, on the other hand trampling results in soil compaction resulting in higher soil bulk density and less soil oxygen. The amount of carbon dioxide released back into the atmosphere is increased due to large herbivores waste. The impact large herbivores have on the ecosystem suggest their importance to the carbon cycle, as with the help of natural disturbances, increased herbivore populations can shift a carbon sink to a source. The boreal forest is a prime example of how increased herbivore populations can negatively impact a ecosystem. Increased herbivore populations significant negative impact on the ecosystem, suggests that they can even be identified as a invasive species.

Fossil carbon extraction

The largest and one of the fastest growing human impacts on the carbon cycle and biosphere is the extraction and burning of fossil fuels, which directly transfer carbon from the geosphere into the atmosphere.  Carbon dioxide is also produced and released during the calcination of limestone for clinker production. Clinker is an industrial precursor of cement.

, about 450 gigatons of fossil carbon have been extracted in total; an amount approaching the carbon contained in all of Earth's living terrestrial biomass.    Recent rates of global emissions directly into the atmosphere have exceeded the uptake by vegetation and the oceans.  These sinks have been expected and observed to remove about half of the added atmospheric carbon within about a century.  Nevertheless, sinks like the ocean have evolving saturation properties, and a substantial fraction (20–35%, based on coupled models) of the added carbon is projected remain in the atmosphere for centuries to millennia. Fossil carbon extraction that increases atmospheric greenhouse gases is thus described by the IPCC, atmospheric and oceanic scientists as a long-term commitment by society to living in a changing climate and, ultimately, a warmer world.

Man-made chemicals
Smaller amounts of man-made petrochemicals, containing fossil carbon, can have unexpected and outsized effects on the biological carbon cycle.  This occurs in part because they have been purposely created by humans to decompose slowly, which enables their unnatural persistence and buildup throughout the biosphere.  In many cases their pathways through the broader carbon cycle are also not yet well-characterized or understood.

Plastics

Close to 400 million tons of plastic were manufactured globally during year 2018 with annual growth rates approaching 10%, and over 6 gigatons produced in total since 1950.   Plastics eventually undergo fragmentation as a typical first step in their decay, and this enables their widespread distribution by air and water currents.  Animals easily internalize microplastics and nanoplastics through ingestion and inhalation, accompanied by risks of bioaccumulation. Biodegradable plastics placed into landfills generate methane and carbon dioxide which cycles through the atmosphere unless captured.  A major review of the scientific evidence as of year 2019 did not identify major consequences for human society at current levels, but does foresee substantial risks emerging within the next century. A 2019 study indicated that degradation of plastics through sun exposure, releases both carbon dioxide and other greenhouse gases.    Bioplastics with a more natural and rapid carbon cycle have been developed as an alternative to other petroleum-based single-use plastics.

Halocarbons

Halocarbons are less prolific compounds developed for diverse uses throughout industry; for example as solvents and refrigerants.  Nevertheless, the buildup of relatively small concentrations (parts per trillion) of chlorofluorocarbon, hydrofluorocarbon, and perfluorocarbon gases in the atmosphere is responsible for about 10% of the total direct radiative forcing from all long-lived greenhouse gases (year 2019); which includes forcing from the much larger concentrations of carbon dioxide and methane.  Chlorofluorocarbons also cause stratospheric ozone depletion. International efforts are ongoing under the Montreal Protocol and Kyoto Protocol to control rapid growth in the industrial manufacturing and use of these environmentally potent gases. For some applications more benign alternatives such as hydrofluoroolefins have been developed and are being gradually introduced.

Climate change feedbacks

Current trends in climate change lead to higher ocean temperatures and acidity, thus modifying marine ecosystems. Also, acid rain and polluted runoff from agriculture and industry change the ocean's chemical composition. Such changes can have dramatic effects on highly sensitive ecosystems such as coral reefs, thus limiting the ocean's ability to absorb carbon from the atmosphere on a regional scale and reducing oceanic biodiversity globally.

The exchanges of carbon between the atmosphere and other components of the Earth system, collectively known as the carbon cycle, currently constitute important negative (dampening) feedbacks on the effect of anthropogenic carbon emissions on climate change. Carbon sinks in the land and the ocean each currently take up about one-quarter of anthropogenic carbon emissions each year.

These feedbacks are expected to weaken in the future, amplifying the effect of anthropogenic carbon emissions on climate change. The degree to which they will weaken, however, is highly uncertain, with Earth system models predicting a wide range of land and ocean carbon uptakes even under identical atmospheric concentration or emission scenarios. Arctic methane emissions indirectly caused by anthropogenic global warming also affect the carbon cycle and contribute to further warming.

See also

References

Further reading
  (Article about the missing carbon sink.)

External links

 Carbon Cycle Science Program – an interagency partnership.
 NOAA's Carbon Cycle Greenhouse Gases Group
 Global Carbon Project – initiative of the Earth System Science Partnership
 UNEP – The present carbon cycle – Climate Change  carbon levels and flows
 NASA's Orbiting Carbon Observatory 
 CarboSchools, a European website with many resources to study carbon cycle in secondary schools.
 Carbon and Climate, an educational website with a carbon cycle applet for modeling your own projection.

Chemical oceanography
Photosynthesis
Soil biology
Soil chemistry
Carbon cycle
Numerical climate and weather models
Effects of climate change